

The Battle of San Juan was an ill-fated British assault in 1797 on the Spanish colonial port city of San Juan in Puerto Rico during the 1796–1808 Anglo-Spanish War. The attack was carried out facing the historic town of Miramar.

Background
Spain aligned itself with France by signing the Second Treaty of San Ildefonso in 1796. Britain then targeted both countries' Caribbean colonies. Admiral Sir Henry Harvey's fleet picked up Sir Ralph Abercromby's army in Barbados. Together, they captured Trinidad from the Spanish, before heading for San Juan.

Battle
On 17 April 1797, Lieutenant-General Sir Ralph Abercromby's fleet of 68 vessels appeared offshore Puerto Rico with a force of 7000, which included German auxiliaries and French émigrés. Two of his frigates then blocked San Juan harbor.

The governor, Field Marshal Don Ramón de Castro y Gutiérrez, had already mobilized his 4000 militia and 200 Spanish garrison troops which, combined with 300 French privateers, 2000 armed peasantry, and paroled prisoners, brought his troop strength up to almost equal that of the British. He also had 376 cannon, 35 mortars, 4 howitzers and 3 swivel guns.

Abercromby landed 3000 troops on 18 April and took control of Cangrejos. Castro moved his forces to Escambrón and the Spanish First Line of Defense.

On 21 April, the British started a 7-day artillery duel with the Spanish forts of San Gerónimo and San Antonio, located at the Boquerón Inlet. At the same time, further Spanish forces put pressure on the British positions, the Spanish recaptured Martín Peña Bridge, while militia led by Sergeant Francisco Díaz raided behind British lines, bringing back prisoners. Then, on the 29th and 30th, the Spanish crossed the Boquerón Inlet, and forced the British to pull back.

Aftermath
On 1 May, the Spanish learned the British were gone, leaving behind arms, stores and ammunition.

References

Further reading
 Alonso, Mariá M. and Milagros Flores (1997). The Eighteenth Century Caribbean and the British Attack on Puerto Rico in 1797. San Juan: National Park Service, Department of the Interior, Publicaciones Puertorriqueñas. 
 Marley, David (1998). Wars of the Americas: a chronology of armed conflict in the New World, 1492 to the present. ABC-CLIO.

External links
 History of the Fixed Regiment of Puerto Rico by Coronel Héctor Andrés Negroni
 

Military history of Puerto Rico
Battles involving Spain
Battles involving Great Britain
Amphibious operations involving the Great Britain
Invasions by Great Britain
Conflicts in 1797
History of San Juan, Puerto Rico
Battles of the War of the First Coalition